Pihos is a surname. Notable people with the surname include:

Pete Pihos (1923–2011), American football player and coach
Sandra M. Pihos (born 1946), American politician

See also
 Piho

Americanized surnames